Originally designed in 1966 by Leonard R Jordan Jr the steering damper, or steering stabiliser is a damping device designed to inhibit an undesirable, uncontrolled movement or oscillation of a vehicle steering mechanism, a phenomenon known in motorcycling as the death wobble. The stabilizer absorbs unwanted energy in the side to side motion allowing the forks and shocks to work properly. Many things can cause a motorcycle chassis to get upset such as slamming on brakes, rough road, and lastly improper setup. An upset chassis can be a great deal of danger for the rider often times resulting in a crash. A steering stabilizer slows those movements down resulting in the rider feeling more comfortable on the motorcycle.

On motorcycles
Sport bikes have a short wheelbase and an aggressive steering geometry to provide the ability to make very quick changes in direction.  This has the harmful side-effect of making the bike less stable, more prone to feedback from uneven road surfaces, and more difficult to control.  If the front wheel significantly deviates from the direction of travel when it touches down, it may cause an unwanted wobble. Steering dampers are factory installed on most sport motorcycles as well as contemporary racing bikes to counter these behaviors.
Steering dampers are also mounted to off-road motorcycles such as motocross and off road bikes. A damper helps keep the bike tracking straight over difficult terrain such as ruts, rocks, and sand, and also smooths out jolts through the handlebars at the end of jumps.  They also reduce arm fatigue by reducing the effort to control the handlebars. While they do help with less fatigue they will not completely take it away. 

On motorcycles, one end of the damper is mounted to the steering yoke or triple tree, the other to the frame. Three main types are linear, electronic and radial.  Linear dampers resemble a telescoping shock absorber and operate in a similar manner.  They can be aligned either longitudinally and to one side of the steering, or transversely across the bike.  Radial dampers resemble small boxes and operate via a rotating pivot.  They are mounted coaxially with the steering axis and are typically located on top of the triple tree (top of fork leg). An electronically variable damper uses a radial damper with hydraulic fluid that flows freely at low speeds, allowing easy turning, while restricting flow at higher speeds when more damping is necessary, as determined by the ECM (Electronic Control Module). A prime example of this is HPSD (Honda Progressive Steering Damper) 
All dampeners use what is called a piston, shims, and oil all of which matter. The piston is what forces the oil through the shims causing the resistance. Different shim setups cause more or less resistance, it all depends on how you stack them. Smaller holes in the middle creates more resistance while a larger hole will allow more fluid to pass by causing less resistance. lastly the oil, there are different weights of oil just like oil in your car. This oil can be thicker or thiner. Lower the weight the thinner it will be while the higher the oil is the thicker it will be.  

Radial steering stabilizer: Hydraulic shock absorbing damper that uses oil to dampen the movement of the bars. As mentioned above this stabilizer mounts on top of the triple tree and goes to the frame. Just like a shock on a motorcycle most of these dampers have a high speed and low speed setting. The high speed control a sudden jerk or movement in the bars while the low speed is a slower gradual turn. Most have some type of adjustment on the top where you can stiffen or loosen the controls to your liking. From the factory they have to options to put shims within the dampener to restrict the flow of fluid causing it to be stiffer. They also have ones that go through your steering stem what you can tighten down on your bearings which creates more restriction. Although this works it is not good on your bearing and will cause premature wear. 

Electronic steering stabilizer: Electronic steering stabilizers work just how they sound, by electronics. Even though it is controlled by electronics there is still oil within the dampener. The Electronics opens a check valve where the fluid will flow through a dampener, vane and then another dampener before leaving the system. These dampeners are mostly used on sport bikes and have a wide range of adjustability depending on the person riding. The dampener is controlled by the ECU or ECM and varies off of speed. Motorcycle factories put a predetermined amount of resistance within the ECM which that the average rider cannot change. If a rider was to get an aftermarket ECM or have the stock one re flashed he would then be able to change it to what he likes. Every factory race program has control of this option, they often times link a GPS into the bike and can control the dampener turn by turn.  

For motorcycles with sidecars, especially for motorcycles which have been retrofitted with a sidecar and where the front wheel geometry, or trail, has not been adjusted for use with a sidecar, a steering damper is beneficial. In older motorcycles adjustable friction dampers had been routinely installed. Hydraulically operated steering dampers may be retrofitted. In some jurisdictions, the installation and operation of a steering damper must be inspected by an expert or examiner and must be entered in the vehicle papers.

On bicycles

Steering dampers have been available for bicycles as well. There is also a mechanism by the same name that consists only of a spring connected to the frame and the fork that merely provides a progressive torque to straighten the steering.

Gallery

References

Motorcycle technology
Vehicle technology